Trepanier Provincial Park is a provincial park in British Columbia, Canada. This  park is roughly 24 km west of Kelowna.

Trepanier Provincial Park was established on April 18, 2001, to protect important water, biodiversity and recreation values, including the Trepanier Creek drainage.  The park includes the Cameron Lake area which is a small fishing lake pleasantly surrounded by mature forest and regenerating stands. The north and west shorelines have been regenerating after a 1970 wildfire and salvage logging.

Images

External links
 The Park Website

References

Provincial parks of British Columbia
Regional District of Central Okanagan
Provincial parks in the Okanagan